Fighting Cock is a brand of Kentucky straight bourbon whiskey produced in Bardstown, Kentucky by Heaven Hill Distilleries, Inc. It is sold in 16 oz (1 pint), 750ml, and 1-liter glass bottles.

The mash bill for Fighting Cock bourbon includes corn, barley and rye, and the product is aged for six years. It is bottled at 103 proof (51.5% alcohol by volume). As of 2022, the bottle label states that this bourbon is aged at least 36 months (3 years).

Reviews
Food critic Morgan Murphy said "The 6-year-old whiskey carries a honey, nutmeg, and leather flavor."

References

External links
 Official website
  Heaven Hill Official site
 The Whisky Portal

Bourbon whiskey
Bardstown, Kentucky
American brands
Alcoholic drink brands